Steven Michael Engel (born December 31, 1961) is a former Major League Baseball pitcher.

He attended Eastern Kentucky University, where he played for the Eastern Kentucky Colonels baseball team.

Engel was drafted by the Chicago Cubs in the 5th round of the 1983 Major League Baseball Draft. He pitched in 11 games for the 1985 Chicago Cubs. In 1986, he was the player to be named later from an earlier trade, in which the Cubs traded Billy Hatcher to the Houston Astros for Jerry Mumphrey.

External links

1961 births
Living people
Baseball pitchers
Baseball players from Cincinnati
Eastern Kentucky Colonels baseball players
Chicago Cubs players
Albuquerque Dukes players
Arkansas Travelers players
Geneva Cubs players
Iowa Cubs players
Lodi Crushers players
Pittsfield Cubs players
Springfield Cardinals players
Tigres del México players
Tucson Toros players
American expatriate baseball players in Mexico